Worshippers Come Nigh is the fourth album led by saxophonist Charles Brackeen which was recorded in 1987 and released on the Swedish Silkheart label.

Reception 

The Penguin Guide to Jazz notes ""Worhippers on Nigh" is as exciting a jazz piece as any in the catalogue, underpinned by Hopkin's fine touch and Cyrille's percussion". In his review for AllMusic, Scott Yanow states "All of the Silkheart sets are worth picking up, but this one (due to its extra intensity and the five particularly strong Brackeen originals) gets a slight edge. Brackeen's passionate playing shows that free jazz was still very much alive (if underground) in the 1980s". In the Los Angeles Times Don Snowden wrote "No one has shone brighter than veteran saxophonist Charles Brackeen in the excellent series presenting "the new American jazz" from Sweden's Silkheart label. The compositions onWorshippers Come Nigh, Brackeen's third album taken from a 1987 session in Dallas, follow a simple pattern—brief unison readings of the themes and then off on extended, free-wheeling improvisations. But with Olu Dara's tart, pithy cornet giving a wild and woolly edge to Brackeen's spiritual tenor tone, drummer Andrew Cyrille's canny propulsion and bassist Fred Hopkins ranging through the sound like an All-Star center fielder, the results are uniformly heady and invigorating"

Track listing 
All compositions by Charles Brackeen.

 "Worshippers Come Nigh" – 7:51
 "Bannar" – 8:06
 "Tiny Town" – 9:00
 "Ible" – 10:51
 "Cing Kong" – 10:28
 "Newsstand" [Take 1] – 9:16 Bonus track on CD release

Personnel 
Charles Brackeen – tenor saxophone
Olu Dara – cornet
Fred Hopkins – bass
Andrew Cyrille – drums, congas
Dennis González – pao de chuva

References 

1988 albums
Charles Brackeen albums
Silkheart Records albums